Esther Farbstein (born 1946) is an Israeli historian, researcher, author, and lecturer. Considered the leading Haredi scholar of the Holocaust, she focuses on the spiritual responses of Jews to Nazi persecution. She has introduced new sources for academic research on the Holocaust, and has also shepherded the incorporation of Holocaust education in Haredi girls schools. In 1994, she founded and became head of the Center for Holocaust Studies at Michlalah–Jerusalem College in Bayit Vegan, Jerusalem. She is the author of numerous books, articles, and monographs in Hebrew and English.

Early life and education
Esther Heine was born into a Gerrer Hasidic family in Jerusalem in 1946. The daughter of Rabbi Yehuda Leib Heine, she is a great-granddaughter of the fourth Rebbe of the Ger Hasidic dynasty, Rabbi Avraham Mordechai Alter, known as the Imrei Emes. Growing up in the years right after World War II, her childhood home often provided lodging for Holocaust survivors who had nowhere else to stay.

She completed her undergraduate studies at Bar-Ilan University and earned a master's degree in Contemporary Jewry from Hebrew University of Jerusalem. She wrote her 1984 master's thesis under the direction of Israeli Holocaust scholar Yehuda Bauer, on the subject "The Rescue of Hasidic Leaders in the Holocaust Era".

She worked for many years as a master teacher at the Horeb Girls School in Jerusalem. In 1994, she founded the Center for Holocaust Studies at Michlalah–Jerusalem College, becoming its head.

Holocaust scholarship
Farbstein is considered the leading Haredi scholar of the Holocaust. Her academic approach, which firmly relies on historical detail and documentation, stands in contrast to the decades-long reliance of the Haredi world on oral traditions, myths, and hagiography. Farbstein says: "When I teach Holocaust history in my community, I say, 'Do not study without sources, without the hard facts'. There is no room for drama here. If I give a lecture and I see that the audience is crying, I think the lecture has failed".

Farbstein's research focuses on the spiritual response of Jews to Nazi persecution. Spiritual resistance—such as continuing mitzvah observance in the ghettos and concentration camps, trying to retain one's humanity even while being treated as subhuman, and submitting questions in Jewish law (she'ilot) on life and death issues—has been largely ignored by secular scholars in favor of the study of physical resistance.

Farbstein shows a willingness to challenge the conclusions of both secular and religious historians in her research. An example of the former is her analysis of the speech given by Rabbi Mordechai of Bilgoray before he left Hungary with the Belzer Rebbe. Secular researchers have concluded that this speech proved that rabbis abandoned their communities in the face of the Nazi threat, or at the least tried to mislead them about the impending danger. Farbstein promotes a third option: that the rabbinical leaders themselves were unaware of the great danger hanging over European Jewry. An example of the latter is a widely publicized story of 93 Bais Yaakov students in the Kraków Ghetto who committed mass suicide rather than be defiled by their German captors, outlining their decision in a letter dated 11 August 1942. While this story has been repeated in public gatherings in Israel and taught in religious schools as an example of Jewish martyrdom, Farbstein examined the authenticity of the documentation and the weight of evidence to the contrary and concluded that "both the story and the letter are literary-pedagogic creations rather than historical sources". Judith Kalik describes Farbstein's approach as "innovative analysis of the sources and … sharp criticism of the existing studies". Haredi author Jonathan Rosenblum calls Farbstein "a fighting historian".

Farbstein has also discovered new sources for academic research on the Holocaust. One new avenue is rabbinic works in which the author writes about his own Holocaust experience in the preface. Since the sefer itself does not relate to the Holocaust, previous Holocaust researchers ignored it. Together with Dr. Nathan Cohen of Bar-Ilan University, Farbstein located more than 100 rabbinical works which include personal Holocaust accounts in the preface, and entered them into a database called the Rabbis' Memoirs Project. This database was released to the public on CD in January 2007.

In the absence of documentation, Farbstein pursued new sources to corroborate a story printed by Rabbi Zvi Hirsch Meisels about him blowing shofar on Rosh Hashana in Auschwitz for a group of 1,400 boys and young men sentenced to be gassed the following day. She asked each of her lecture audiences over a period of years if they knew anyone who had heard that shofar-blowing. In so doing, she located ten eyewitnesses who verified the incident.

Impact on Holocaust education in Haredi schools

Farbstein has been a driving force behind the integration of Holocaust studies into the curriculum of religious girls schools. She conducts teacher-training seminars in the Bais Yaakov school system, some Hasidic school systems such as Vizhnitz and Belz, and also the Yad Vashem school for teachers of the Holocaust. She produces study modules and short documentary films to aid in Holocaust education.

For decades, this subject was not taught in Haredi schools, in large part due to the community's opposition to the Zionist perspective that "monopolized the documentation", criticized European rabbis for encouraging their flocks to remain in Europe instead of emigrating to Palestine, and claimed the victims went to their deaths "like sheep to the slaughter". "Without a doubt, in the early decades, there was a fear that if they dealt with the Holocaust, many questions would arise", Farbstein asserts. She believes her academic approach takes Holocaust studies out of the realm of the "emotional", and into "orderly historical knowledge".

In 2012, Farbstein created an online tournament to test Israeli high school students on their knowledge of Holocaust events. The first tournament was based on the history of the Warsaw Ghetto.

Farbstein frequently lectures on Holocaust topics in international conferences and seminars for the public.

Personal life
She is married to Rabbi Moshe Mordechai Farbstein, currently rosh yeshiva of the Hebron Yeshiva. The couple has seven children.

Bibliography

Books
Hebrew

 (co-authored with Asaf Yedidya and Nathan Cohen)

English
 (2 vol.)

 (2 vol.)

Edited works

Monographs

Selected articles in English

References

External links
Esther Farbstein page at Michlalah-Jerusalem College

1946 births
Living people
Historians of the Holocaust
20th-century Israeli women writers
21st-century Israeli women writers
Israeli Orthodox Jews
Jewish women writers
Bar-Ilan University alumni
Hebrew University of Jerusalem alumni
Writers from Jerusalem